The October 2021 nor'easter, which eventually became Tropical Storm Wanda, was an erratic nor'easter and tropical cyclone that struck the East Coast of the United States, and meandered across the northern Atlantic Ocean in early November 2021. The powerful extratropical cyclone affected much of the East Coast, causing significant flooding in areas which were previously affected by hurricanes Henri and Ida. As Wanda, the cyclone was the twenty-first and final tropical cyclone of the 2021 Atlantic hurricane season. The system originated from a non-tropical disturbance over the Southern United States on October 23, subsequently moved out into the Atlantic. The storm quickly developed into a powerful bomb cyclone off the East Coast of the United States on October 27, causing flooding and bringing powerful gale-force winds to the region in the process. The system then weakened and moved eastward, further out into the Atlantic. On October 31, at 03:00 UTC (11 p.m. EDT on October 30), the system transitioned into a subtropical storm and was given the name Wanda. As the system slowly curved southeastward, it continued organizing, before transitioning into a fully-tropical storm on November 1. Over the next several days, Wanda subsequently moved northward, before curving southward and then accelerating northeastward, before degenerating into a post-tropical cyclone on November 7. On the next day, Wanda's remnant was absorbed into a larger extratropical cyclone to the north.

At the height of the nor'easter, the storm left over 617,000 customers without electrical power in the Northeastern United States, and the storm killed at least two people. Damage from the nor'easter is estimated to have exceeded $200 million (2021 USD).

Meteorological history

On October 23, a non-tropical disturbance developed over southern Texas. For the next couple of days, the system gradually strengthened while moving eastward, along the U.S. Gulf Coast. On October 25, the system emerged into the Atlantic, off the coast of Georgia, and developed an area of low pressure. On the previous day, the National Hurricane Center (NHC) began monitoring the system, noting that it could potentially develop into a subtropical or tropical cyclone several days later, after it reached the North Atlantic. Early on October 26, the NHC noted that the system had a low chance of developing into a subtropical cyclone before it would merge with another approaching extratropical system, though the storm had a larger chance of becoming subtropical later in the week, after it moved out further into the Atlantic. Afterward, the system began moving northeastward, along the East Coast, developing into an extratropical system while quickly strengthening. On October 26, the system underwent explosive intensification, developing into a powerful nor'easter. During this period of time, the nor'easter absorbed another extratropical system over the Northeastern United States, which was located to the west. 

Afterward, the system gradually weakened while moving eastward, further out to sea. The NHC continued to monitor the system, though they downgraded its chances of development within the next five days from 40% to 30% by then. On October 29, the system began acquiring subtropical characteristics as it grew more organized, with the NHC increasing its chances of development over the next two days from 40% to 90% that same day. At 03:00 UTC on October 31, the extratropical storm completely shed its frontal structure and transitioned into a subtropical storm, and the NHC initiated advisories on Subtropical Storm Wanda.

Wanda continued to organize while slowly curving counterclockwise, and at 21:00 UTC on November 1, Wanda transitioned into a fully-tropical storm. Around 09:00 UTC on November 2, Wanda developed a burst of convection, which managed to wrap around its center, allowing the storm to strengthen slightly. However, several hours later, Wanda entrained more dry air, which degraded the storm's inner-core convection while the system turned northward. Despite the dry air entrainment, the storm's low-level circulation organized further, allowing the storm to maintain its intensity. On the next day, Wanda's structure improved as it continued its northward track, even though its intensity remained the same. Around 03:00 UTC on November 5, Wanda turned eastward, before turning southward several hours later, around 15:00 UTC, as a mid-level ridge built up to the northwest of the storm. Late on November 6, Wanda began accelerating northeastward, as a larger extratropical cyclone approached the storm from the west. By 15:00 UTC on November 7, Wanda began merging with a cold front in the approaching extratropical cyclone, and the storm's circulation began opening up into a trough, marking Wanda's transition into a post-tropical cyclone. Wanda's remnant continued accelerating northeastward, becoming embedded within the frontal zone on November 8, before being fully absorbed into the larger extratropical cyclone to the north shortly afterward.

Preparations

Northeastern United States
More than 100 schools closed in Cape Cod, Massachusetts in advance of the nor'easter. The Governors of New Jersey and New York declared states of emergency, with the National Weather Service issuing flash flood watches and flash flood warnings across the Northeastern United States. New York City Mayor Bill de Blasio had storm drains cleared and sandbags deployed. Multiple school districts closed across New Jersey, in anticipation of the flooding. Phil Murphy, the Governor of New Jersey, declared a state of emergency for the storm early on October 25. As a precaution, schools were shuttered, and flash flood warnings were issued across the state.

Impact
According to Aon Benfield, damages from the nor'easter was estimated at over $200 million. At the height of the storm, over 617,000 customers lost power in the Northeastern United States. The storm also killed at least 2 people in the United States.

New Jersey 
Many places around the state experienced flash floods as a result of the rain, while the Saddle River overflowed its banks, generating six to seven feet (1.83 to 2.13 meters) of water near the basin. In Union Beach, more than a dozen water rescues were executed after vehicles were trapped by floodwaters. Trees were also felled by strong winds across the area, with one instance in Morris County killing a woman and wounding another. A tree also fell on a house, causing minor damage.

Massachusetts 
Over 500,000 customers lost electricity in Massachusetts, due to the nor'easter. Unofficial wind gusts of 110 mph in Wellfleet and 107 mph in Provincetown were recorded at exposed coastal locations. The system also brought heavy rainfall to the state, causing flooding. Its subsequent wind gusts felled trees, blocking several roadways and causing the widespread power outage. Small boats were also washed ashore by the storm, and the nor'easter brought strong seas to the state. Some homes were also damaged as trees fell on them. A plane was damaged at the New Bedford Regional Airport after being blown off the runway. In Hingham, a large tree brought down wires. Brockton also received over 300 calls for help, along with its mayor declaring a state of emergency starting on October 27. Shelters were also opened to accommodate potential evacuees. Ferry services were affected, with very restricted operations permitted.

New York
In New York State, the body of a missing kayaker was found, after he tried to cross Long Island Sound ahead of the nor'easter. A flash flood emergency was issued for the Finger Lakes region of New York. Delaware, Otsego, and Sullivan counties experienced flooding. Portions of the Bronx River Parkway closed due to the flooding, and the Staten Island Railway was suspended for 3 hours between Huguenot and Tottenville.

Elsewhere
In Rhode Island, the storm cut the power to 92,000 customers. In Maine, over 25,000 customers experienced power outages.

See also

Weather of 2021
Tropical cyclones in 2021
List of storms named Wanda
Timeline of the 2021 Atlantic hurricane season
1991 Perfect Storm – another nor'easter that became a tropical cyclone
October 2017 North American storm complex
Tropical Storm Melissa (2019) – affected the same areas and transitioned from a subtropical to a tropical storm off the East Coast of the U.S.

References

External links

The NHC's Advisory Archive on Tropical Storm Wanda

2021 meteorology
Wanda (2021)
Wanda
Tropical cyclones in 2021
Nor'easters
Subtropical storms
Hurricanes in the United States
2021 natural disasters in the United States
Hurricanes in New Jersey
Hurricanes in New York (state)
Hurricanes in Rhode Island
Hurricanes in Massachusetts
2021 disasters in Canada